The first Swiss football championship was held 1897–98. The championship was not organized by the Swiss Football Association (SFA; founded in 1895) and is therefore considered as unofficial. The tournament was organized by the Geneva newspaper La Suisse Sportive and its editors François-Jean Dégérine and Dr. Aimé Schwob. The championship trophy was donated by the company Ruinart. Only four of the clubs competing were members of the SFA; FC Château de Lancy, Grasshopper Club Zürich, Neuchâtel FC and La Villa Ouchy). The series A was divided into three regional groups, group A in the north, group B the district  around Lausanne and group C district of Genève). The winner of each group qualified for the finals.

The following are the statistics to the first Swiss national football (soccer) competition (later Swiss Super League).

Group A

Group B

Group C

Final

Grasshopper Club Zürich won the championship.

References

Sources 
 Switzerland 1898-99 at RSSSF

1897-98
Seasons in Swiss football 
1897–98 in Swiss football
Swiss